Domingos José Gonçalves de Magalhães, Viscount of Araguaia (August 13, 1811 – July 10, 1882), was a Brazilian poet, playwright, physician and diplomat. He is considered the founder of Romanticism in Brazilian literature, and was a pioneer of the Brazilian theatre.

He is the patron of the 9th chair of the Brazilian Academy of Letters.

Biography

Domingos José Gonçalves de Magalhães was born in Rio de Janeiro, to Pedro Gonçalves de Magalhães Chaves. His mother's name is unknown. He entered in a Medicine course in 1828, graduating in 1832. In the following year, he travelled to Europe, where he met and befriended Manuel de Araújo Porto-Alegre and was exposed to the Romantic ideals. He wrote in 1836 a Romantic manifesto, Discurso Sobre a História da Literatura no Brasil, and, in the same year, he published the poetry book Suspiros Poéticos e Saudades, the first Romantic work to be written by a Brazilian.

Returning to Brazil in 1837, he wrote two tragic plays: António José, ou O Poeta e a Inquisição in 1838 and Olgiato in 1839. Also in 1838 he becomes a Philosophy teacher in the Colégio Pedro II. He also founded with Porto-Alegre and Francisco de Sales Torres Homem the short-lived magazine Niterói; only two issues of it were published.

He entered the diplomatic career in 1847, becoming minister in the United States, Argentina, Austria and in the Holy See. He was also a chargé d'affaires in the Kingdom of the Two Sicilies, the Piedmont, Russia and Spain. Very esteemed by Emperor Pedro II, he was decorated with the Order of the Rose, the Order of Christ and the Order of the Southern Cross, and with the title of Baron of Araguaia in 1872, being elevated to Viscount two years later.

Magalhães married Januaria de Sa Pinto Ribeiro. 
Magalhães had a daughter Januaria, born in Rio de Janeiro on the 02.08.1855, dead in Versailles (France) on the 27.04.1928, and who married at Paris on the 12.12.1883 Bozon Doublet Marquess of Persan and Bandeville. Magalhães had also a son, Antônio José Gonçalves de Magalhães de Araguaia, who was proclaimed Count of Araguaia by the Holy See. Antonio José Maria, known in France as Amédée Joseph Marie, was part of the Brasilian diplomatic delegation in Paris, and was born on the 21.01.1859, died in Paris on the 29.10.1917, he married Marie Eugénie Cornelio Dos Santos, daughter of Jean and Cecilia Souza Breves, born in Petropolis on the 27.11.1870 and dead at Paris on the 02.10.1936. They had 4 children : Marie known as Olga °Paris 03.10.1889, +Paris 26.08.1960, she married at Paris 20.01.1908 Georges de Marande; Edmond Amédée °Paris 29.11.1890, +Paris 22.02.1892; Armand Marie Joseph +Ouchy (Switzerland) 14.05.1910 at 15 years old; Odette °Paris 27.02.1902, + Rouen 15.07.1990; the only descendants today are on the Persan side (French public records for births, marriages and deaths)

Gonçalves de Magalhães died in Rome, on July 10, 1882.

Works
 Discurso Sobre a História da Literatura no Brasil (1836)
 Suspiros Poéticos e Saudades (1836)
 António José, ou O Poeta e a Inquisição (1838)
 Olgiato (1839)
 A Confederação dos Tamoios (1856)
 Os Mistérios (1857)
 Urânia (1862)
 Cânticos Fúnebres (1864)
 Fatos do Espírito Humano (1865)
 A Alma e o Cérebro (1876)
 Comentários e Pensamentos (1880)

External links

 Magalhães' biography at the official site of the Brazilian Academy of Letters 

1811 births
1882 deaths
19th-century Brazilian poets
Brazilian diplomats
Romantic poets
Brazilian male poets
Brazilian people of Portuguese descent
Patrons of the Brazilian Academy of Letters
Writers from Rio de Janeiro (city)
Brazilian nobility
Portuguese-language writers
19th-century Brazilian dramatists and playwrights
Brazilian male dramatists and playwrights
19th-century Brazilian male writers
Brazilian magazine founders
Ambassadors of Brazil to the United States